The 2019–20 Saudi Professional League was the 44th edition of the Saudi Professional League, the top Saudi professional league for association football clubs, since its establishment in 1976. The season started on 22 August 2019 and concluded on 9 September 2020.

Al-Nassr were the defending champions. The league was contested by the top 13 teams from the 2018–19 season as well as Abha, Damac, and Al-Adalah, who joined as the three promoted clubs from the 2018–19 Prince Mohammad bin Salman League. They replace Ohod, Al-Batin and Al-Qadsiah who were relegated to the 2019–20 Prince Mohammad bin Salman League.

On 7 March 2020, the Ministry of Sports announced that all matches would be played behind closed doors until further notice. On 14 March 2020, the Ministry suspended all sports competitions indefinitely due to the COVID-19 pandemic in Saudi Arabia. On 11 June 2020, the Ministry of Sports announced the resumption of sports activities with training starting on 21 June and games starting after 4 August 2020 and played behind closed doors. On 1 July 2020, the schedule for the remaining matches was released. It was announced that the league would resume on 4 August 2020 and end on 9 September 2020.

On 29 August 2020, Al-Hilal won the league for a record 16th time with two matches remaining, after defeating Al-Hazem 4–1. Al-Adalah were the first team to be relegated following a 1–1 home draw with Al-Raed on 29 August 2020. On 4 September 2020, Al-Hazem were relegated following a 1–0 defeat away to Al-Shabab. Al-Fayha were the third and final team to be relegated following a 1–0 defeat away to Al-Taawoun in the final matchday.

Changes
On June 9, 2019, the Saudi FF announced that the number of foreign players was reduced from 8 players to 7 players. In addition, they announced that clubs could no longer sign players on amateurs contracts and that the squad size will be increased to 30 players. On 20 August 2019, the Saudi FF announced that relegation play-off between the 13th placed team of the Pro League and the 4th placed team of the MS League was cancelled.

Teams

Sixteen teams will compete in the league – the top twelve teams from the previous season, the play-off winner and the three teams promoted from the MS League.

Teams who were promoted to the Pro League

The first team to be promoted was Abha, following their 2–2 draw away to Al-Nojoom on 30 April 2019. Abha will play in the top flight of Saudi football after a ten-year absence. Despite losing to Al-Qaisumah, they were crowned champions on 11 May 2019 due to Damac's 1–1 draw with Al-Ain.

The second team to be promoted was Damac, in spite of their 1–0 defeat away to Al-Tai, on 5 May 2019. Damac will play in the top flight of Saudi football for the first time since 1982 when both the Pro League and First Division were merged into one league.

The third and final team to be promoted was Al-Adalah, who were promoted on the final matchday following their 2–0 win at home against Damac on 15 May 2019. Al-Adalah will play in the top flight of Saudi football for the first time in history.

Teams who were relegated to the MS League

The first team to be relegated was Ohod, ending a 2-year stay in the Pro League following a 3–1 home defeat to Al-Fayha on 12 April 2019.

The second team to be relegated was Al-Batin, ending a 3-year stay in the Pro League following a 1–0 home defeat to an already relegated Ohod side on 11 May 2019.

The third and final team to be relegated was Al-Qadsiah, who were relegated on the final matchday following a 2–2 home draw with Al-Hazem. Al-Qadsiah were relegated after 4 consecutive seasons in the Pro League.

Stadiums
Note: Table lists in alphabetical order.

1:  Al-Faisaly play their home games in Al Majma'ah. 
2:  Al-Nassr and Al-Shabab also use Prince Faisal bin Fahd Stadium (22,500 seats) as a home stadium.
3:  Damac play their home games in Abha.

Personnel and kits 

 1 On the back of the strip.
 2 On the right sleeve of the strip.
 3 On the shorts.

Managerial changes

Foreign players
On June 9, 2019, the Saudi FF announced that the number of foreign players was reduced from 8 players to 7 players.

Players name in bold indicates the player is registered during the mid-season transfer window.

League table

Positions by round
The following table lists the positions of teams after each week of matches. In order to preserve the chronological evolution, any postponed matches are not included to the round at which they were originally scheduled but added to the full round they were played immediately afterward. If a club from the Saudi Professional League wins the King Cup, they will qualify for the AFC Champions League, unless they have already qualified for it through their league position. In this case, an additional AFC Champions League group stage berth will be given to the 3rd placed team, and the AFC Champions League play-off round spot will be given to 4th.

Results

Season statistics

Scoring

Top scorers

Hat-tricks

Most assists

Clean sheets

Discipline

Player 

 Most yellow cards: 12
 Alberto Botía (Al-Wehda)
 Khaleem Hyland (Al-Faisaly)

 Most red cards: 3
 Mohammed Al-Saiari (Al-Wehda/Al-Faisaly)
 Karam Barnawi (Abha)

Club 

 Most yellow cards: 75
 Al-Wehda

 Most red cards: 7
 Al-Shabab

Attendances

By round

By team

†

†

†

Awards

Monthly awards

Number of teams by region

See also
 2019–20 Prince Mohammad bin Salman League
 2019–20 Second Division
 2020 King Cup
 2019 Super Cup

References

1
Saudi Professional League seasons
Saudi Professional League
Saudi Arabia, 1